Maria Herrijgers (born 3 July 1955) is a former Belgian racing cyclist. She won the Belgian national road race title in 1978 and 1979.

References

External links
 

1955 births
Living people
Belgian female cyclists
Cyclists from Antwerp Province
People from Kalmthout